Mother Agnès Arnauld, S.O.Cist. (1593–1672), was the Abbess of the Abbey of Port-Royal, near Paris, and a major figure in French Jansenism.

She was born Jeanne-Catherine-Agnès Arnauld, a member of the Arnauld family, sister of Antoine Arnauld, "le Grand Arnauld" and of Mother Angélique Arnauld. She succeeded Angélique as head of the abbey in 1658, thus leading it during the most repressive anti-Jansenist period. She organised the movement against signing the Formulary of Alexander VII and for this was confronted by Hardouin de Péréfixe, the Archbishop of Paris. She was also the author of the Constitutions of Port-Royal, a text which reformed the material and spiritual rule of the abbey in a spirit of Cistercian renewal.

Bibliography 
Perle Bugnon-Secrétan, Mère Agnès Arnauld. 1593 - 1672. Abbesse de Port-Royal, Cerf, 1996, 272 p.

1593 births
1672 deaths
Nuns from Paris
17th-century French nuns
16th-century Christian mystics
17th-century Christian mystics
Cistercian abbesses
Jansenists
French Roman Catholic abbesses
Cistercian mystics
Burials in Île-de-France